A lockbox or lock box refers to a box, container or otherwise enclosed space with a built-in lock. Examples include:

Physical storage 
 Bank vault, a secure space where money, valuables, records, and documents are stored
 Post office box, a rented secure mailbox at a post office
 Safe, a secure lockable box used for securing valuable objects
 Safes for holding keys
 Knox Box, a small, wall-mounted safe that stores the key to a building, used by firefighters and emergency services
 Real-estate lock box, a box that stores the keys to a building, used by real-estate agents
 Safe deposit box, a secure container for storage of valuables, usually in a bank

Financial services 
 Lockbox (accounts receivable), a service offered to organizations by commercial banks to simplify collection and processing of accounts receivable

See also 
 Locker, a small lockable storage compartment
 Keychain, small ring or chain of metal to which several keys can be attached